Darren Ritchie (born 1975) is a Scottish former long jumper. He was born in Edinburgh.

He was a six-time Scottish long jump champion, and also won the triple jump in 2004. He also added two Scottish indoor titles in long jump. He was a three-time winner at the AAA Championships.

He finished fourth at the 2002 Commonwealth Games, missing the bronze medal with a one centimetre margin. He also narrowly missed the qualification standards for the 1996 and 2004 Summer Olympics, although in the latter case he came close with a new Scottish record of 8.01 metres.

He lives in Bo'ness and his club was Sale Harriers. He has also been based in Oslo, Norway.

Ritchie is currently Scottish Athletics National Jumps and Combined Events Manager (September 2008).

References
 2006 Commonwealth Games profile
 Sporting Heroes profile
 
http://www.scottishathletics.org.uk/index.php?p=17&itemType=news&itemId=3172

External links

1975 births
Living people
Sportspeople from Edinburgh
Scottish male long jumpers
Commonwealth Games competitors for Scotland
Athletes (track and field) at the 2002 Commonwealth Games
Athletes (track and field) at the 2006 Commonwealth Games
British male triple jumpers